Syd Anderson (born 9 March 1949) is a former Australian rules footballer who played with South Melbourne in the Victorian Football League (VFL).  He is the brother of Collingwood player Graham Anderson.

Notes

External links 

 

1949 births
Living people
Australian rules footballers from Victoria (Australia)
Sydney Swans players
Port Melbourne Football Club players